7 is the seventh studio album by French DJ and record producer David Guetta, released on 14 September 2018 by What a Music, Parlophone and Big Beat Records. Released as a double album, the collection features commercial pop collaborations on the first disc, whilst disc two features underground house music akin to Guetta's starting roots as a DJ. The latter is credited to Jack Back, which Guetta revealed to be his alias and as a means to release more dance music alongside his pop collaborations. This side of the album is known as the Jack Back Project and was also released independently as a mixtape titled the Jack Back Mixtape, preceded by the release of the song "Overtone".

On 7, Guetta is reunited with frequent collaborators Sia, Bebe Rexha, Nicki Minaj and Martin Garrix, as well being joined by new collaborators Anne-Marie, Faouzia, Madison Beer, Charli XCX, French Montana, J Balvin, Jason Derulo, Willy William, Saweetie, Justin Bieber, Jess Glynne, Lil Uzi Vert, G-Eazy, Mally Mall, Delilah Montagu, Ava Max, CeCe Rogers and  Stefflon Don who all contribute vocals to the album. Guetta worked with a range of different record producers and DJs on the album, notably including Brooks, Ralph Wegner, Albert Harvey (half of dance duo Glowinthedark), Giorgio Tuinfort and Norwegian production duo Stargate, amongst others. The album was preceded by the release of nine singles over 2017–2018, including "2U", "Dirty Sexy Money", "Like I Do", "Flames", "Your Love", "Don't Leave Me Alone", "Goodbye" and "Drive".

Upon release, the album garnered mixed reviews from critics who were torn between the predictability of Guetta's collaborations, with some praising the second side of the album a return to his roots as an underground DJ. 7 was released on 28 September 2018 as a CD and vinyl. The album made several top-ten debuts including in Australia, Belgium, France, Italy and the UK and Ireland. In the US, the album opened at number 37 on the Billboard 200 albums chart although it did top become Guetta's third Dance/Electronic Albums chart topper.

Background and release 
7 is a two-disc collection, with the first disc including Guetta's commercial pop collaborations. The second disc features a mixtape of underground house and dance music credited to Jack Back which was revealed to be an alias of Guetta's. The album's name has a special meaning to Guetta; elaborating on the theme and name of the album he said "it is my seventh album, but the number seven also represents the end of a cycle; a week is seven days, the creation of the world in the Bible is seven days and my birthday is on (Nov. 7). That number is kind of magic to me." In an interview with DJ Pete Tong, Guetta said the album represented a full cycle and return to his house roots. "I originally started in underground house music, playing all the raves and underground clubs in Paris. I wanted to make music just for fun, with absolutely no commercial approach to it. I want to make every type of music that I like, I'm doing it for the love of music."

"It represents a different side of me. Basically, I come from house music, and I wanted to go to my roots and just do something for fun. It's a double album, so the idea is not to compromise. The first album is completely pop, and the second album is completely underground. Instead of trying to do a little bit of everything on the same record I'm like, OK, let’s go hard! All the way pop and all the way electronic." — Guetta on his "double album" and alias 'Jack Back'.

Alongside the release of the album's official singles, a number of other songs were released throughout the recording of the album. On 27 March 2017, Guetta released "Light My Body Up" featuring frequent collaborator Nicki Minaj and Lil Wayne which reached the top twenty in Finland and France but only reaching number 64 in the UK. This was then followed on 28 April by the release of "Another Life", a collaborative release with Dutch DJ Afrojack and featuring vocals from singer songwriter Ester Dean. Then "Complicated" with Dimitri Vegas & Like Mike featuring Kiiara was released on 28 July.

On 3 November Guetta and Afrojack released "Dirty Sexy Money" featuring Charli XCX and French Montana. The following month, Guetta and Dutch DJ Martin Garrix released their collaboration "So Far Away" featuring Jamie Scott and Romy Dya. Guetta and Dutch EDM duo Showtek sampled the classic 90s dance song "Show Me Love" for their collaboration "Your Love", released in June 2018. These songs along with "Mad Love" with Sean Paul and Becky G are included on some of the international releases of the album.

Promotion 
Guetta performed at Meyer Werft (Papenburg, Germany) for the official naming of AIDA Cruises' newest cruiser line, the AIDAnova. on 31 August 2018. On 1 September 2018, Guetta headlined the first day of the 2018 Fusion Festival, which took place at Otterspool Promenade in Liverpool, UK.

On 9 September, Guetta released a mixtape of the second side of the album as a DJ Mix. The Jack Back Mixtape contains the 12 songs released under his alias 'Jack Back'. Additionally in the run up to 14 September, Guetta released a series of teaser videos via his official instagram, each video features music from the album and together, the screencaps of the videos make up the album cover.

Singles 
"2U" featuring Justin Bieber was released as the album's first single on 7 June 2017. The song peaked in the top-ten of over 15 countries worldwide including in the UK, much of Europe and Australia and New Zealand. This was followed up by "Dirty Sexy Money", with Afrojack and featuring vocals from Charli XCX and French Montana. Guetta described the collaboration as the type of song "he'd always wanted to make". "Dirty Sexy Money" peaked in the top-thirty in France, top-forty in the UK and top-ten on many dance charts.

"Like I Do" was jointly released with Martin Garrix and Brooks on 22 February 2018. This is followed by the singles "Flames", with Sia, on 22 March, and "Don't Leave Me Alone", featuring Anne-Marie, on 27 July. The EDM track "Overtone" was released as a single from the Jack Back Mixtape via Beatport on 20 August 2018.

On 24 August 2018, Guetta simultaneously released two further singles from the album, "Goodbye" with Jason Derulo (featuring Nicki Minaj and Willy William) and "Drive", a collaboration with South African DJ Black Coffee and featuring vocals from Delilah Montagu. Both songs debuted on the US Billboard Dance/Electronic Songs at numbers 12 and 31 respectively, making Guetta the artist with the most entries on the chart since its creation, bringing his total to 34.

"Say My Name" with Bebe Rexha and J Balvin was released as the album's eighth single on 26 October 2018.

Critical reception

7 received mixed reviews from music critics. When describing the music releases of the week, MTV described the album as "huge" and "filled with features and bops that will keep you dancing 'till 2019." In writing for Rolling Stone, Elias Leight said that the first half of the album was familiar territory for Guetta, "stuffed to bursting with the type of cross-genre collaborations that made Guetta a global star". He also remarked that Guetta's album was in keeping with current trends by including Afro-house (his Black Coffee collaboration) and reggaeton with two songs featuring J Balvin. He rounded off his review by saying that Guetta missed the trick by revealing he was being the alias 'Jack Back', "it would have been bolder, of course, if Guetta had dropped an album under a fake name and kept his identity secret. But there's no point in being bold when there’s money to be made by hedging bets". The Times Will Hodgkinson described the album as "Guetta having his cake and eating it,". According to Hodgkinson, "disc one features cheesy pop; disc two showcases his credible roots as a house and techno DJ." He also criticised the commercial collaborations as "formulaic hit fodder" for "drowning in a sea of Auto-tune".

In a more positive review AllMusic's Neil Z. Yeung gave the album 4 out of 5 starts saying that Guetta "entered a free-spirited, late-era comfort zone, making music for the fun of it instead of chasing another radio smash," and comparing disc one to a  "festival headlining set, building nicely before an unrelenting middle stretch that winds down the euphoria at the close." Yeung also described the album as "celebratory", and finished his review by saying "Not since One Love (2009) has Guetta sounded as uplifted or invested. 7 is a pure joy to experience and a reminder that Guetta is still a master of the genre."

Commercial performance
7 debuted at number 37 on the US Billboard 200 with 15,000 album-equivalent units, which included 3,000 pure album sales. It serves as David Guetta's third number-one on the US Dance/Electronic Albums.

Track listing
Guetta is credited for writing and producing all of the songs on the standard and limited editions of the album. Additional credits are provided below.

Notes
  signifies an additional producer
  signifies a vocal producer
  signifies a co-producer
  signifies an additional vocal producer

Sample credits
 "Goodbye" contains elements from "Time to Say Goodbye" as written by Francesco Sartori, Lucio Quarantotto and Franck Peterson
 "She Knows How to Love Me" contains elements from "Tutti Frutti" as written by Richard Penniman, Dorothy La Bostrie and Joe Lubin
 "Let It Be Me" contains elements of "Tom's Diner" as written by Suzanne Vega.
 "Reach for Me" contains elements from "Reach For Me" as written by Oscar Gaetan and Ralph Falcon
 "Freedom" contains elements from "All Join Hands" as written by CeCe Rogers
 "Grenade" contains elements from "We Want Your Soul" as written by Adam Freeland and Damian Taylor
 "Overtone" contains elements of "Altai Sayan Tandy-Uula" as written by Andrei Mangush

Credits and personnel 
Credits adapted from Guetta's website and album booklet.

Recording locations 

Poundcake Studios (Rotterdam, Netherlands)
Future History Studios (Los Angeles, California)
Glenwood Place Studios (Burbank, California)
Studio Urbain (Paris, France)
Piano Music Studio (Amsterdam, Netherlands)
Can Rocas Studio (Ibiza, Balearic Islands)
Conway Recording Studios (Hollywood, California)
Jay Sound Studio (Hilversum, Netherlands)
Tribe Studios (Naples, Italy); mastering only
DMI Studios (Las Vegas, Nevada); mastering only
Sine Music Studios (Villingen-Schwenningen, Germany)
De Muziekfabriek (Kruisland, Netherlands; mastering only

Featured artists and vocalists 

Allison Kaplan – background vocals
Anne-Marie – featured artist, vocals
Ava Max – featured artist, vocals
Bebe Rexha – featured artist, vocals
Chris Willis – featured artist, vocals
CeCe Rogers – co-lead artist
David Guetta (also credited as Jack Back) – lead artist, instrumentation, producer, programming
Delilah Montagu – featured artist, vocals
Faouzia – featured artist, vocals
Francesca Richard – background vocals
G-Eazy – featured artist, vocals
J Balvin – featured artist, vocals
Jason DeRulo – co-lead artist, vocals
Jess Glynne – featured artist, vocals
Justin Bieber – featured artist, vocals
Lil Uzi Vert – featured artist, vocals
Madison Beer – featured artist, vocals
Mally Mall – featured artist, vocals, producer
Nicki Minaj – featured artist, vocals
Noonie Bao – background vocals
Sarah Aarons – background vocals
Saweetie – featured artist, vocals
Sia – featured artist, vocals
Stefflon Don – featured artist, vocals
Talay Riley – background vocals
Willy William – featured artist, vocals

Musicians and technicians 

Albert Harvey (Glowinthedark) – additional production, instrumentation, producer, programming
Black Coffee – producer
Boaz Van De Beatz – additional production, producer
Brooks – instrumentation, mastering, mixing, producer, programming
Carl Falk – producer, vocal producer
Chris "Tek" O'Ryan – vocal engineer, vocoder
Chris Braide – producer, vocal producer
Cirkut – producer
Daddy's Groove – mastering, mixing
Daniel "Cesqeaux" Tuparia – additional production, programming
David Saint Fleur – producer
Fred Rister – instrumentation, producer, programming
Giorgio Tuinfort – instrumentation, piano, producer, programming
Jack Hisbach – instrumentation, producer, programming
Jason Boyd – vocal producer
John Hanes – engineer
Jonathan Rotem – producer
Josh Gudwin – vocal engineer
Lotus IV – instrumentation, producer, programming
Louis Henry Sarmiento II – engineer
Marcus Van Wattum – additional production, composer
Martin Garrix – instrumentation, producer, programming
Mitch Allan – vocal producer
Monsieur Georges – talk box
Netsky – producer
Nick Seeley – keyboards
Phil Greiss – producer
Pianoman – talk box
Pierre-Luc Rioux – guitar
Priscilla Renea – vocal producer
Ralph Wegner – additional production, instrumentation, producer, programming
Red Triangle – producer
Serban Ghenea – mixing
Stargate – producer
Steve Aoki – producer
Teal Douville – producer
Timofey Reznikov – additional production, instrumentation, mixing, producer, programming
Vodka – producer

Artwork 

Ellen von Unwerth – photography
Youbold – graphic design

Charts

Weekly charts

Year-end charts

Certifications

Release history

References

2018 albums
David Guetta albums
Parlophone albums
House music albums by French artists
Dance music albums by French artists
Albums produced by David Guetta
Albums produced by Stargate
Albums produced by Jason Evigan
Albums produced by Poo Bear
Albums produced by Cirkut
Albums produced by J. R. Rotem